Dr Peter Jones FRCP (born 1937) is a British consultant paediatrician, known for his work in the fields of haemophilia and HIV/AIDS.

His roles include consultant paediatrician at the Royal Victoria Infirmary, Newcastle upon Tyne; director of the Newcastle Haemophilia Centre; and executive member of the World Federation of Hemophilia.

In 1981, the Haemophilia Society awarded him their Gold Medal, the Macfarlane Award. He is a Fellow of the Royal College of Physicians (FRCP).

In September 2016, he appeared in an edition of the BBC Radio 4 programme The Reunion, to discuss contaminated blood products that were used to treat British haemophiliacs.

Bibliography

References

External links 
 

1937 births
Place of birth missing (living people)
Living people
British paediatricians